EOTA can refer to:

 European Organisation for Technical Approvals
 Ford Consul EOTA, a variant of the Ford Consul produced from 1951 to 1956
 Ēota land, the Old English name for Jutland